Pine Island Plantation Complex is a historic hunting plantation complex and national historic district located on Pine Island near Frogmore, Beaufort County, South Carolina.  The district encompasses six contributing buildings and one contributing sites, and is an early-20th century hunting plantation. The main house at Pine Island was built about 1904, and is a two-story frame structure built on an existing tabby foundation. The front façade features a full-width two-story porch.  Also on the property are the contributing cottage, a toolshed/doghouse, a barn, a pumphouse, an automobile garage, and causeway.

It was listed in the National Register of Historic Places in 1989.

References

Houses on the National Register of Historic Places in South Carolina
Historic districts on the National Register of Historic Places in South Carolina
Houses completed in 1904
Houses in Beaufort County, South Carolina
National Register of Historic Places in Beaufort County, South Carolina
Plantations in South Carolina
Plantation houses in South Carolina